David Savage (born 30 July 1973) is an Irish former professional footballer who last played for Southern League Premier Division side Oxford City as a midfielder. Savage left Oxford United after being their Player of the Year to reunite with manager Ian Atkins at Bristol Rovers. He enjoyed a reasonably good spell of two years at Rovers before moving back North for family reasons.

He earned 5 caps playing for his country.

He made a scoring League of Ireland debut for Kilkenny City  on 7 October 1990.

References

External links

Living people
1973 births
Association football midfielders
Kilkenny City A.F.C. players
Brighton & Hove Albion F.C. players
Longford Town F.C. players
League of Ireland players
Millwall F.C. players
Northampton Town F.C. players
Oxford United F.C. players
Bristol Rovers F.C. players
Rushden & Diamonds F.C. players
Brackley Town F.C. players
Republic of Ireland association footballers
Republic of Ireland international footballers
Republic of Ireland under-21 international footballers
Association footballers from County Dublin